Chymotrypsin-like elastase family member 3B also known as elastase-3B, protease E, or fecal elastase is an enzyme that in humans is encoded by the CELA3B gene.

Clinical literature that describes human elastase 1 activity in the pancreas or fecal material is actually referring to chymotrypsin-like elastase family member 3B (i.e. the enzyme / protein this article focuses on).

Function 

Elastases form a subfamily of serine proteases that hydrolyze many proteins in addition to elastin. Humans have six elastase genes which encode the structurally similar proteins elastase 1, 2, 2A, 2B, 3A, and 3B. Unlike other elastases, elastase 3B has little elastolytic activity. Like most of the human elastases, elastase 3B is secreted from the pancreas as a zymogen and, like other serine proteases such as trypsin, chymotrypsin and kallikrein, it has a digestive function in the intestine. Elastase 3B preferentially cleaves proteins after alanine residues. Elastase 3B may also function in the intestinal transport and metabolism of cholesterol. Both elastase 3A and elastase 3B have been referred to as protease E and as elastase 1, and excretion of this protein in fecal material is frequently used as a measure of pancreatic function in clinical assays.

Clinical significance 
Fecal elastase is a medical test that measures how well the pancreas is functioning.

The fecal elastase test measures the concentration of the elastase-3B enzyme found in fecal matter with an enzyme-linked immunosorbent assay (ELISA). Results of this test can give a good indication of exocrine pancreatic status, and the test is less invasive and expensive than the current "gold standard", secretin-cholecystokinin test. Levels of fecal elastase lower than 200 μg / g of stool indicate an exocrine insufficiency. Correlations between low levels and chronic pancreatitis and cancer have been reported.

References

External links

Further reading

EC 3.4.21